Conus striolatus is a species of sea snail, a marine gastropod mollusk in the family Conidae, the cone snails and their allies.

These snails are predatory and venomous. They are capable of "stinging" humans, therefore live ones should be handled carefully or not at all.

Description
The size of an adult shell varies between 20 mm and 46 mm. The striate spire has a moderate size. The body whorl is long and rather cylindrical, and closely striate below. Its color is white, clouded with bluish ash, orange-brown, chestnut or chocolate, everywhere encircled by narrow chocolate interrupted lines, often separated into somewhat distant dots. The middle of body whorl is usually irregularly fasciate with white. The spire is tessellated with chestnut or chocolate.

Distribution
This species occurs in the Pacific Ocean from Thailand to Micronesia and from Taiwan to Queensland, Australia.

References

 Kiener L.C. 1844–1850. Spécies général et iconographie des coquilles vivantes. Vol. 2. Famille des Enroulées. Genre Cone (Conus, Lam.), pp. 1–379, pl. 1-111 [pp. 1–48 (1846); 49–160 (1847); 161–192 (1848); 193–240 (1849); 241-[379](assumed to be 1850); plates 4,6 (1844); 2–3, 5, 7–32, 34–36, 38, 40–50 (1845); 33, 37, 39, 51–52, 54–56, 57–68, 74–77 (1846); 1, 69–73, 78–103 (1847); 104–106 (1848); 107 (1849); 108–111 (1850)]. Paris, Rousseau & J.B. Baillière
 Dautzenberg, P. 1910. Liste de coquilles recueillies par ler P. Aubin dans l'ile de Rua-Sura (Archipel Salomon) en 1909. Journal de Conchyliologie 58: 24–33
 Röckel, D., Korn, W. & Kohn, A.J. 1995. Manual of the Living Conidae. Volume 1: Indo-Pacific Region. Wiesbaden : Hemmen 517 pp.
 Filmer R.M. (2001). A Catalogue of Nomenclature and Taxonomy in the Living Conidae 1758 – 1998. Backhuys Publishers, Leiden. 388pp.
 Tucker J.K. (2009). Recent cone species database. September 4, 2009 Edition
 Tucker J.K. & Tenorio M.J. (2009) Systematic classification of Recent and fossil conoidean gastropods. Hackenheim: Conchbooks. 296 pp
 Bozzetti L. (2010) Conus simonis (Gastropoda: Prosobranchia: Conidae) a new species from Southeastern Madagascar. Malacologia Mostra Mondiale 66: 11–12.
 Tucker J.K. & Tenorio M.J. (2013) Illustrated catalog of the living cone shells. 517 pp. Wellington, Florida: MdM Publishing.
 Puillandre N., Duda T.F., Meyer C., Olivera B.M. & Bouchet P. (2015). One, four or 100 genera? A new classification of the cone snails. Journal of Molluscan Studies. 81: 1–23
 Franklin, J.B, K. A. Subramanian, S. A. Fernando and Krishnan K. S. (2009). Diversity and distribution of cone snails (Vallapoo) along the Tamilnadu coast, India, Zootaxa 2250: 1-63 (Monograph).

External links
 The Conus Biodiversity website
 Cone Shells – Knights of the Sea
 
 Holotype at MNHN, Paris

striolatus
Gastropods described in 1845